Norton is an unincorporated community in Dubois and Orange counties, in the U.S. state of Indiana.

History
A post office was established under the name Dillon in 1907, was renamed Norton in 1908, and was discontinued in 1938.

Geography

References

Unincorporated communities in Dubois County, Indiana
Unincorporated communities in Orange County, Indiana
Unincorporated communities in Indiana